is a Japanese politician of the New Komeito Party, a member of the House of Councillors in the Diet (national legislature). A native of Niiza, Saitama, he attended Kyoto University and received a master's degree in agricultural economy from it. He also studied at Uppsala University in Sweden. He was elected to the House of Councillors for the first time in 2004.

References

External links 
  in Japanese.

Members of the House of Councillors (Japan)
Kyoto University alumni
Living people
1973 births
New Komeito politicians
21st-century Japanese politicians